Yaw Brempong-Yeboah (born 5 May 1954) is a Ghanaian politician and a member of the fourth parliament of the fourth Republic of Ghana representing the Atiwa West constituency in the Eastern Region of Ghana.

Early life and education 
Yeboah was born 5 May 1954 in Atiwa West in the Eastern Region of Ghana. He attended the University of Ghana and obtained his Bachelor of Science after he studied Agricultural science.

Politics 
Yeboah was first elected into parliament on the ticket of the New Patriotic Party during the December 2000 Ghanaian General elections representing the Atiwa West Constituency in the Eastern Region. He polled 18,689 votes out of the 27,959 valid votes cast representing 66.80%. He polled 25,468 votes out of the 34,314 valid votes cast representing 74.20% in 2004. He was defeated by Kwasi Annoh Ankamah in their Party's Parliamentary Primary in 2008.

Career 
Yeboah is a marketing manager by profession. He is the Deputy minister of Foreign Affairs and a former member of Parliament to the Atiwa West Constituency.

Personal life 
Yeboah is a Christian.

References 

Living people
1954 births
University of Ghana alumni
New Patriotic Party politicians
Ghanaian MPs 2001–2005
Ghanaian MPs 2005–2009
Ghanaian Christians
People from Eastern Region (Ghana)
Ghanaian agriculturalists
Foreign ministers of Ghana
21st-century Ghanaian politicians